The following lists events that happened during 1865 in Chile.

Incumbents
President of Chile: José Joaquín Pérez

Events

November
26 November - Battle of Papudo

Births
date unknown - Tomás Guevara (d. 1935)
1 April - Irene Morales (d. 1890)

Deaths
date unknown - Joaquín Tocornal (b. 1788)
28 November - José Manuel Pareja (b. 1813)

References 

 
1860s in Chile
Chile
Chile
Years of the 19th century in Chile